Vivian Reiss (born 1952 in New York) is an artist. She has been living and working in Toronto, Ontario, Canada, since 1975. She still spends time in New York City, New York, U.S. Reiss is a painter, creator of multimedia performance events and installations, designer of architectural projects, costumes, gardens and furniture; and currently working on a cook book. Reiss is the owner and creator of the Reiss Gallery, located at 500 College Street in Toronto.

Life and work
Reiss studied fine art at the School of the Museum of Fine Art in Boston and the Art Institute in Boston. She apprenticed under the guidance of Marilyn Powers and Jason Berger at the Direct Vision Atelier in Brookline, Massachusetts.

Reiss is known for her large-scale oil-on-canvas works. Her art work is characterized by vibrancy of colour and expression, as well as complex compositional ideas. Reiss has had a long-term interest in still-life, portraiture and landscapes. Her subject matter ranges from her own garden, to snow monkeys in Japan, to kewpie dolls, to grazing sheep.

Her 35 plus years as a career artist includes more than 50 shows, both in Canada and around the world, over 30 of which were one-woman shows. Reiss' art work is in numerous collections, including collections of heads of state; the Canadian Embassies in Washington and Paris; and in private and corporate collections in more than 15 countries.

Career spotlight
In October 2008, Reiss showed at the Gardiner Museum in Toronto. The show was entitled El Museo del Jardin de la Humanidad (The Museum of the Garden of Humanity) – the show featured portraits of immigrant Mexican farm workers who worked on Southern Ontario farms. The portraits were also shown with paintings of Reiss' farm garden in Toronto. The exhibition was with the support of the Consulate General of Mexico in Toronto, Canada.

Reiss was invited to create work for the 2006 Echigo-Tsumari Triennial; one of the largest international art exhibitions in Japan and considered the Japanese equivalent of the Venice Biennale. The art project was entitled Satoyama Storehouse and featured the portraits of the inhabitants of Hachi, a small rice farming village in the mountains of Japan. Reiss lived in the village for three months as part of the artist residency and during the Triennial Reiss' work was exhibited in the village's abandoned school house and viewed by more than 300,000 people. In addition to the Triennial, Reiss had a concurrent show at the Canadian Embassy in Tokyo of her portraits of prominent Canadians in the arts.

A catalogue of Reiss' portraits has been published showcasing a wide range of subjects.
See portraits section below for more details.

The Reiss Gallery
The Reiss Gallery is located at 500 College Street, in Toronto's Little Italy quarter, and was designed by Reiss herself. The design of the gallery is unique, with the exterior of the building displaying larger-than-life wooden monkeys and a 20-foot Plexiglas 'paint palette' window design along with an oversized wooden paint brush. The gallery's interior is covered in cut ceramic plates with tiled portals flanked by curved walls and moldings – an architectural work of art where everything seems to be folding in on itself.

Portraits
Reiss has painted many notable artists, performers, public personalities and philanthropists, including:
 Opera singer Fides Krucker. Fides has been the subject of numerous portraits by Reiss, several of which were created in conjunction with multimedia performances and installations that featured Fides performing.
 Helen and George Vari: supporters of York University and Ryerson University, through the Helen and George Foundation. George Vari is a member of Canada's Privy Council and during his career as a developer built numerous buildings around the world, including the tallest building in Europe.
 Eve Egoyan – pianist
 Ofra Harnoy – cellist
 Marie-Josée Chartier – teacher, dancer and choreographer
 Natalie Kovacs – artist
 Caroline Woods – dancer
 Gordie Johnson – singer and songwriter
 Deborah Demille – actor
 Linda C. Smith – composer
 Jean Stilwell – mezzo-soprano
 Garine Torossian – film maker
 Ariel Garten – psychotherapist, artist and designer Ariel Garten
 Joel Garten – composer and pianist Joel Garten
 Irving Garten

Collections
 Canadian Embassy, Washington, USA
 Private collection of the president of Hungary
 Private collection of former prime minister of Canada Brian Mulroney
 CANFAR, Toronto, Canada
 Canadian Museum of Animal Art, Ontario, Canada
 Four Seasons Hotel, Toronto, Canada

Shows and exhibitions
 Gardiner Museum, Toronto, Canada 2008
 Japan Foundation, Toronto, Canada 2007
 Echigo-Tsumari Triennial, Japan 2006
 The Canadian Embassy, Tokyo, Japan 2006
 Catch 22 Gallery, Toronto, Canada 2000
 JK ROM, Royal Ontario Museum, Toronto, Canada 1999 & 1996
 Garten Mansion, Toronto, Canada 1998
 Gardiner Museum, Toronto, Canada 1997
 Garten Mansion, Toronto, Canada 1997
 Park Plaza Hotel, Toronto, Canada, 1996-7
 International Art Fair, Miami, Florida 1996
 Teodora Gallery 1996
 Bata Shoe Museum, Toronto, Canada 1995
 Teodora Gallery, Toronto, Canada 1995
 Garten Mansion, Toronto, Canada 1995
 Art Gallery of Ontario, Toronto, Canada 1994
 Gallery Herouet, Paris, France 1994
 Canadian Cultural Centre, Paris, France 1994
 Design Exchange, Toronto, Canada 1994
 Visual AIDS International Exhibition 1994
 Internal Resource Development Centre, Ottawa, Canada 1994
 Alliance Française, Toronto, Canada 1994
 Garten Mansion, Toronto, Canada 1994
 Garten Mansion, Toronto, Canada 1993
 Gallery Etienne de Causans, Paris, France 1992
 Espace Chapon, Paris, France 1992
 H.B. Starr Gallery, Palm Beach, Florida 1992
 ORT, Toronto, Canada 1992
 Fort York Museum, Toronto, Canada 1992
 Alliance Française, Toronto, Canada 1992
 Garten Mansion, Toronto, Canada 1991
 Art for Living Gallery, North Butler, New Jersey 1983
 Scandinavian Canadian Club, Toronto, Canada 1983
 O'Keefe Center, Toronto, Canada 1982
 Nancy Merril Studio, Hamilton, Canada 1982
 O'Keefe Center, Toronto, Canada 1981
 La Cantinetta, Toronto, Canada 1979
 Ohio State University, Columbus, Ohio 1979
 Guildart Gallery, Toronto, Canada 1978
 York University, Toronto, Canada 1978
 Holy Blossom, Toronto, Canada 1977

Quotes
Quote from Deirdre Kelly, Curating at Home, Globe and Mail July 6, 2007. "Artists paint, sculpt or otherwise create things that people often collect. But in the case of Toronto-based painter Vivian Reiss, collecting is as much of a passion as invigorating a blank canvas with her trademark bursts of colour." 

Quote from Rita Zekas, Reiss Up To Some Monkey Business, Toronto Star December 15, 2007.
Quote in conjunction to Reiss' work in Hachi, Japan and her Satoyama Story portrait project. Reiss is quoted within this quote.
"She found the generous spirit of her subjects amazing, considering the perception that the Japanese are a people who hide their emotions, 'During the process of painting them, they opened up. Every day, there were offerings of food and flowers. I felt humbled; the people were so warm and generous.'"

Awards and residences
 Artist in Residence, Hachi, Japan 2006
 Artist in Residence, Segovia, Spain 1984
 Finalist, Ontario Renews Award 1987
 Best Restoration, Toronto Historical Board 1987

Media room
Reiss has been the subject, a quoted expert and notable source for many print and broadcast publications for many years of her art career.

Print media coverage
 Toronto Star November 14, 2009 
 National Post October 16, 2009 
 Toronto Star November 5, 2009
 Gardening Life Fall 2008
 Globe and Mail May 31, 2008 
 Globe and Mail July 6, 2007 
 Toronto Star December 15, 2007 
 EYE Weekly September 20, 2007 
 NOW (Nuit Blanche issue) 2007 
 Canadian Interiors May/June 2004
 NOW August 17, 2000 
 Flare Magazine May 1999
 Spring cover for feature section, Globe and Mail 1999
 Toronto Star December 6, 1998
 National Post December 1, 1998
 House and Home November 1998
 NOW urban living feature cover and story spring 1998
 Toronto Star February 21, Jan 1 and 15 1998
 Toronto Star November 20, 1997
 NOW November 20, 1997
 NOW December 26, 1996
 EXTRA! November 21, 1996
 NOW November 14, 1996
 Toronto Life January 1996
 Toronto Star September 1995
 Chatelaine Fall 1995
 NOW April 9, 1995
 Globe and Mail July 4, 1994
 City and Country Home June 1994
 Palm Beach Daily News March 1994
 EYE Weekly November 1993
 Toronto Sun April 1993
 NOW April 15, 1993
 City and Country Home November 1992
 Canadian Jewish News July 30, 1992
 NOW February 16, 1992
 EYE Weekly November 7, 1991
 EYE Weekly October 10, 1991
 Toronto Sun July 7 and 11, 1991
 Toronto Star January 13, 1991
 Palm Beach Daily News March 1990

Broadcast media coverage
 FAVE TV 2000
 Canadian House and Home CTV 1999
 Vintage Vintage 1998
 CFTR News 1996
 Bravo TV Special 1996
 CKVR TV October 1995
 CityTV AM October 3, 1995
 CityLine TV 1995
 CBC Midday 1995
 CBC Arts and Entertainment Profile 1995
 Bravo News 1995
 CityTV Marilyn Dennis Morning Show 1992
 Homeworks 1992
 CHCH TV Success Profiles 1992

Bibliography

Vivian Reiss: Portraits (2001). A catalogue of Vivian Reiss' series of portraits of Canadians in the arts.

References

External links
 www.vreiss.com
 Secret ingredients are bounty from the garden and dumb luck
  Renowned Canadian Artist Vivian Reiss has 2 exhibitions beginning Oct 4, 2008
 Irving Garten
 Reiss up to some monkey business
 COLOUR IT BEAUTIFUL
 Gardening article about Vivian Reiss
 Toronto Office Space designed by Vivian Reiss
 Toronto apartments designed by Vivian Reiss
 Painter’s work encompasses the world
 Living in full colour - The Toronto Star
 Artist in Residence Vivian Reiss - The Toronto Star
 Vivian Reiss Designs
 Vivian Reiss Landscape Designer

1952 births
Living people
American women painters
American women installation artists
American installation artists
American emigrants to Canada
Artists from Toronto
Artists from New York (state)
20th-century American artists
21st-century American artists
21st-century American women artists
20th-century American women artists
American contemporary painters